Khoveynes (also known as Khovnes and Khūnes) is a village in Buzi Rural District, in the Central District of Shadegan County, Khuzestan Province, Iran. At the 2006 census, its population was 186, in 35 families.

References 

Populated places in Shadegan County